Nundah was an electoral district of the Legislative Assembly in the Australian state of Queensland from 1888 to 1992.

The district was based in the northern suburbs of Brisbane. At the time of its abolition it included the suburbs of Nundah, Eagle Farm, Hendra and Toombul.

History
In the 1904 Queensland state election, the sitting Ministerialist Thomas Bridges faced a formidable opponent in the person of Sir Arthur Rutledge. Rutledge had been a Wesleyan minister in New England and solicitor in Brisbane, before entering the Queensland parliament, where he rose to the office of Attorney-General and accepted a knighthood in 1903. As part of his strategy to become Premier, Rutledge decided to not to recontest his seat of Maranoa but rather contest an electorate closer to Brisbane, and chose the semi-rural seat of Nundah which, he assumed, would be easily won by a man of his political experience, especially as it was already held by a fellow Ministerialist. Many large business houses backed Rutledge, as did the editor of the Brisbane Courier (Rutledge's son-in-law Charles Brunsdon Fletcher was the editor of the Brisbane Courier until 1903). His public meetings were packed with prominent religious and political leaders, in contrast to a low-key campaign run by Bridges based on his community service and commitment to keep the cost of railway tickets low. Contrary to every prediction, Bridges won the election by 253 votes. This humiliating loss ended Rutledge's political career, and he accepted an appointment as district judge.

Members for Nundah

Election results

See also
 Electoral districts of Queensland
 Members of the Queensland Legislative Assembly by year
 :Category:Members of the Queensland Legislative Assembly by name

References

Former electoral districts of Queensland
1888 establishments in Australia
1992 establishments in Australia
Nundah, Queensland
Constituencies established in 1888
Constituencies disestablished in 1992